Bloomfield-Mespo School District is a small school district in Trumbull County, Ohio, USA. The district operates Mespo Elementary School and Bloomfield High School.

Education in Trumbull County, Ohio
School districts in Ohio